Rene Alexander Steer (born 31 January 1990) is an English footballer who plays as a left back for Hemel Hempstead Town. He previously played for Arsenal, Gillingham, Oldham Athletic, Staines Town, St Neots Town, Woking, Maidenhead United and Hampton & Richmond Borough.

Career

Arsenal 
Steer began his career in the Arsenal Academy, joining the club at age 13. In the 2006–07 season, he made 11 appearances for the Arsenal Reserves. During the 2007–08 season, he made 12 appearances for the reserves, and another 11 appearances for the Under-18 team. He signed a professional contract with the club on 10 September 2007. He received his first first-team call-up on 2 December 2008 as an unused substitute in Arsenal's 2–0 League Cup defeat to Burnley, as well as two appearances in the Premier Reserve League in the first half of the 2008–09 season. During his time for the club's reserves, he also made several appearances in the FA Youth Cup, including a good performance in a 2–2 draw versus Bristol City, before making a decisive shot in the penalty shootout. He was included in the first team in October 2008 in the Premier League for nine matches.

Gillingham 
On 22 January 2009, Steer was loaned out to Gillingham for four months. On 7 February, he made his debut for the club as he came on as a substitute in the 78th minute, in a 2–0 loss to Bradford City. He made his first start for the club in a 4–4 draw versus Aldershot Town on 18 February. He returned to Arsenal in April 2009 following the end of his loan, but was released by the club in June.

Oldham Athletic 
Steer signed a 12-month contract with League One club Oldham Athletic on 24 June 2009, following a successful trial. On 17 August, he was sent to hospital following a training session, during which time he received an elbow to the face. Later that day he underwent a successful operation on his jaw at North Manchester General Hospital to repair and correct "serious damage" to his teeth. Steer was released at the end of the 2009–10 season.

Non-league 
After his release by Oldham, Steer dropped into non-League and signed for Conference South club Staines Town and then in September 2011, he joined St Neots Town in the Southern League Division One Central. In February 2013 he signed forms for Woking, but a serious injury kept him out of football for most of that season. His only appearance for the Cards came in the Surrey Senior Cup exit against Godalming Town on 4 March 2013. In August 2013 he re-signed for St Neots Town. In September 2013, he scored from 40 yards in an FA Cup tie against Canvey Island. Steer then joined Boston United before signing for Maidenhead United in the summer of 2015. After five seasons, Steer left the Magpies at the end of the 2019-20 season. He joined Hampton & Richmond Borough on 20 August 2020, before departing in November after being unable to hold down a starting spot. Steer joined Hemel Hempstead Town in February 2021.

Career statistics

References

External links 
 

Rene Steer at Aylesbury United

1990 births
Living people
Footballers from Luton
English footballers
Association football defenders
Arsenal F.C. players
Gillingham F.C. players
Oldham Athletic A.F.C. players
Staines Town F.C. players
St Neots Town F.C. players
English Football League players
National League (English football) players
Boston United F.C. players
Woking F.C. players
Maidenhead United F.C. players
Hampton & Richmond Borough F.C. players
Hemel Hempstead Town F.C. players